Los Sangurimas is a novel written by Ecuadorian writer José de la Cuadra in 1934.

The story is set in the property "La Hondura", in the Ecuadorian coast.  It is about the Sangurimas, a family full of conflicts and legends and taking justice into their own hands.

References

1934 novels
Ecuadorian novels
Novels set in Ecuador